The 3 arrondissements of the Ardèche department are:
 Arrondissement of Largentière, (subprefecture: Largentière) with 151 communes. The population of the arrondissement was 101,490 in 2016.  
 Arrondissement of Privas, (prefecture of the Ardèche department: Privas) with 66 communes.  The population of the arrondissement was 84,907 in 2016.  
 Arrondissement of Tournon-sur-Rhône, (subprefecture: Tournon-sur-Rhône) with 118 communes. The population of the arrondissement was 138,760 in 2016.

History

In 1800 the arrondissements of Privas, Largentière, Tournon were established. All of them have never been disbanded. In 2007 the four cantons of Antraigues-sur-Volane, Aubenas, Vals-les-Bains and Villeneuve-de-Berg from the arrondissement of Privas were assigned to the arrondissement of Largentière.

The borders of the arrondissements of Ardèche were again modified in January 2017:
 two communes from the arrondissement of Privas to the arrondissement of Largentière
 five communes from the arrondissement of Privas to the arrondissement of Tournon-sur-Rhône
 three communes from the arrondissement of Tournon-sur-Rhône to the arrondissement of Largentière
 eight communes from the arrondissement of Tournon-sur-Rhône to the arrondissement of Privas

References

Ardeche